Jeff Adams (born September 6, 1989) is a former American football offensive tackle. He played college football at Columbia University.

Early years
Adams played high school football and basketball for the Lyons Township High School Lions. He earned All-West Suburban Conference honors in both football and basketball. He captained the football team his senior year. Adams averaged 13 points, nine rebounds and two blocks per game in basketball. He was also named Class 8A Academic All-State.

College career
Adams played for the Columbia Lions from 2008 to 2011.

Professional career

Dallas Cowboys
Adams signed with the Dallas Cowboys on April 30, 2012 after going undrafted in the 2012 NFL Draft. He was released by the Cowboys on August 30, 2012.

Cincinnati Bengals
Adams was signed to the Cincinnati Bengals' practice squad on September 2, 2012. He was released by the Bengals on November 13, 2012.

Miami Dolphins
Adams was signed to the Miami Dolphins' practice squad on November 19, 2012. He was released by the Dolphins on August 31, 2013.

Tennessee Titans
Adams was signed to the Tennessee Titans' practice squad on September 11, 2013. He was released by the Titans on August 29, 2014.

Houston Texans
Adams signed with the Houston Texans on August 31, 2014. He made his NFL debut on December 21, 2014 against the Baltimore Ravens. On September 20, 2015, Adams tore his patellar tendon in a game against the Carolina Panthers and on September 21, 2015, Adams was placed on injured reserve.

On September 3, 2016, Adams was released by the Texans. He was re-signed by the Texans on October 26, 2016. On November 7, Adams was once again released by the Texans and was re-signed to the practice squad two days later.

New York Jets
On February 8, 2017, Adams signed with the New York Jets. He was waived on September 1, 2017.

References

External links
NFL Draft Scout
Columbia bio
Miami Dolphins bio
Tennessee Titans bio

Living people
1989 births
Players of American football from Illinois
American football offensive tackles
Columbia Lions football players
Dallas Cowboys players
Cincinnati Bengals players
Miami Dolphins players
Tennessee Titans players
Houston Texans players
People from Berwyn, Illinois
New York Jets players